Blues on the Bayou is the thirty sixth studio album by B.B. King, released in 1998.

In the CD liner notes, B.B. King writes: "Of the many records Lucille and I have had the pleasure of recording over the years, this one is especially close to my heart. It's also one of the most relaxed and, for me, satisfying [...] No one was telling us what to do. No one needed to tell us what to do." He adds that he considers the band playing on this album as his best ever and that he got to the studio with the idea of keeping the music simple ("I've felt the urge to go back to basics."). With this state of mind, the record was cut in four days: "Found some old B. B. King songs. Wrote some new ones. [...] All live, all real. No overdubs, no high-tech tricks. Just basic blues."

The album won the 2000 Grammy Award for Best Traditional Blues Album.

Track listing 
All tracks composed by B.B. King; except where indicated 
"Blues Boys Tune" - 3:25 
"Bad Case of Love" - 5:28 
"I'll Survive" - 4:53 (B.B. King, Saul Samuel Bihari )
"Mean Ole' World" - 4:29 
"Blues Man" - 5:20 
"Broken Promise" - 3:34 (B.B. King, Saul Samuel Bihari )
"Darlin' What Happened"(B.B. King, Saul Samuel Bihari ) - 5:26 
"Shake It Up and Go" (B.B. King, Jules Taub) - 3:10
"Blues We Like" - 5:08 
"Good Man Gone Bad" (B.B. King, Jules Taub, Ferdinand Washington)- 3:20
"If I Lost You" (B.B. King, Jules Taub) - 4:57
"Tell Me Baby" (B.B. King, Saul Samuel Bihari ) - 3:26
"I Got Some Outside Help I Don't Need" (B.B. King, David Clark) - 4:37
"Blues in G" - 3:28 
"If That Ain't It I Quit" - 3:20

Charts

Personnel 
B.B. King - electric guitar, lead vocals
James Bolden - trumpet, bandleader
Walter R. King - contractor
Tony Coleman - percussions 
Calep Emphrey Jr. - drums
Melvin Jackson - saxophones
Leon Warren - electric rhythm guitar
Michael Doster - bass guitar
James Sells Toney - piano, Hammond B-3 organ
Stanley Abernathy - trumpet
Phil Marshall - orchestrations
Tony Daigle - engineer
Jim Watts - assistant engineer
John Porter, Joe McGrath - mixing engineers
Stephen Marcussen - mastering engineer
Gary Ashley - A&R
Sidney A. Seidenberg - Executive producer

Recorded at Dockside Studio, Maurice, Louisiana; Mixed at Sound Castle, Los Angeles, California; Mastered at Precision Lacquer, Hollywood, California

References

1998 albums
B.B. King albums
MCA Records albums